The Kenton Hotel is a historic hotel in Portland, Oregon.  It was built in 1909, added to the National Register of Historic Places on October 16, 1990, and identified as a contributing resource in the Kenton Commercial Historic District when the district was added to the National Register on September 3, 2001.

History 
The building was first built by the Swift Meat Packing company in 1909. Since the building deteriorated from the 1970s to the 1980s, it was almost demolished in 1990. However, owing to its history, it was kept and added to the National Register of Historic Places.

See also
National Register of Historic Places listings in North Portland, Oregon

References

External links

1909 establishments in Oregon
Apartment buildings on the National Register of Historic Places in Portland, Oregon
Hotel buildings completed in 1909
Hotel buildings on the National Register of Historic Places in Portland, Oregon
Kenton, Portland, Oregon
Portland Historic Landmarks
Individually listed contributing properties to historic districts on the National Register in Oregon